The  Tennessee Titans season was the franchise's 43rd season in the National Football League, the 53rd overall, the 16th in the state of Tennessee and the second under head coach Mike Munchak. It was also the last full season under the ownership of Bud Adams, who died on October 21, 2013. The Titans failed to improve on their 9–7 record in 2011 and were eliminated from postseason contention in Week 14.

2012 draft class

Notes
 Traded up to acquire pick from the Dolphins.
Pick from the Browns through the Vikings.

Staff

Final roster

Schedule

Preseason

Regular season

Note: Intra-division opponents are in bold text.

Game summaries

Week 1: vs. New England Patriots

Week 2: at San Diego Chargers

Week 3: vs. Detroit Lions

Week 4: at Houston Texans

Week 5: at Minnesota Vikings

Week 6: vs. Pittsburgh Steelers

Week 7: at Buffalo Bills

Week 8: vs. Indianapolis Colts

Week 9: vs. Chicago Bears

Week 10: at Miami Dolphins

Week 12: at Jacksonville Jaguars

Week 13: vs. Houston Texans

With the loss, the Titans fell to 4–8 and were swept by the Texans for the first time since 2004.

Week 14: at Indianapolis Colts

Week 15: vs. New York Jets

Week 16: at Green Bay Packers

Week 17: vs. Jacksonville Jaguars

Standings

References

External links
 

Tennessee
Tennessee Titans seasons
Titans